Palaeotanyrhina is an genus of extinct insects in the phylum Arthropoda. The type species Palaeotanyrhina exophthalma had large bulging eyes, an elongated mouth and sticky feet for capturing prey items. P. exophthalma lived 100 million years ago during the Middle Cretaceous period in modern day Myanmar. The specimen was found in amber southwest of Maingkhwan in the Kachin state (26°20'N, 96°36'E).

References 

Extinct Hemiptera
Cretaceous insects of Asia
Fossils of Myanmar
Burmese amber
Fossil taxa described in 2022